The House of Lara (Spanish: Casa de Lara) is a noble family from the medieval Kingdom of Castile.  Two of its branches, the Duques de Nájera and the Marquesado de Aguilar de Campoo were considered Grandees of Spain. The Lara family gained numerous territories in Castile, León, Andalucía, and Galicia and members of the family moved throughout the former Spanish colonies, establishing branches as far away as the Philippines and Argentina. 

The House of Lara were most prominent in the history of Castile and León from the 11th to the 14th century. Álvaro Núñez de Lara served as regent for Henry I of Castile. They were dispossessed of much of their land by Peter the Cruel, but most was returned by Henry II.

History 

The family arose in 11th century Castile through a marriage that united the paternal lands around Lara de los Infantes belonging to Gonzalo Núñez with the inheritance of his wife, Goto Núñez, representing the holdings of the noble Álvarez and Alfonso families. By the 13th century, the Lara family origin had been linked to the protagonists in the epic Cantar de los Siete Infantes de Lara (Song of the Seven Lara Princes), a 10th-century tale of revenge set around the lands subsequently held by the Lara family, but there is no evidence that the tale reflected historical events and the names in the legend cannot be matched with the family's known ancestry.  

From the 12th through 15th centuries, members of the Lara family found themselves at different times either supporting of or opposing their monarch. In 1113, Pedro González de Lara supported Queen Urraca of Castile in her struggles against her former husband, Alfonso I of Aragon. Pedro and his brother, Rodrigo, also confronted her son Alfonso VII in 1130. Rodrigo later helped Alfonso counter the rise of the Almoravids. Manrique Pérez de Lara, Álvar Pérez and Nuño Pérez de Lara disputed the regency of Alfonso VIII, and Fernando Núñez de Lara was Alfonso's alférez. Álvaro Núñez de Lara became regent of Henry I. Nuño González de Lara served Ferdinand III and Alfonso X, but in 1270 led an alliance of nobles against the same king. Juan Núñez I de Lara el Gordo, Señor de Albarracín, opposed the enthronement of Sancho IV, and had to temporarily flee to France.  Juan Núñez II de Lara headed various rebellions against Alfonso XI. Ultimately, the family suffered greatly after the victory of King Peter against his usurping half-brother, Henry II.

The Manrique de Lara 
The only branch of the family to survive the Middle Ages were the Manrique de Lara, who supported the Catholic Monarchs in their war against the supporters of the contender Joanna la Beltraneja. In 1520, Emperor Charles V raised the House of Lara to the position of grandee, as dukes of Nájera and marquesses of Aguilar de Campoo. Members of the family were to serve the crown as viceroys, captain generals, ambassadors and cardinals. The first Count of Paredes de Nava became Master of the Order of Santiago. The authors Gómez Manrique and Jorge Manrique belong to this branch of the Lara.

The original coat of arms is supposed to represent two cauldrons, which represent the ability of the family to sustain many followers.

Family tree 

|-
|style="text-align: left;"|
style="border-spacing: 2px; border: 1px solid darkgray;"
-
 align="center" | 
 Members of the House of Lara in the male line
-
 
 Marriage or extramarital relationship
-
 
 Descent
-
 
 Extra-marital Descent

|-
|style="text-align: left;"|Notes:

References

Bibliography

External links 
Foundation for Medieval Genealogy: CASTILE & LEÓN NOBILITY (1): LARA